The Knee Surgery, Sports Traumatology, Arthroscopy is a monthly peer-reviewed medical journal published in English covering orthopaedic surgery, especially related to sports trauma and surgeries, in particular arthroscopies.

The journal is the official journal of the European Society of Sports Traumatology, Knee Surgery and Arthroscopy . It was established in 1992 with Ejnar Eriksson as founding editor-in-chief for the first 16 years. He was succeeded by Jon Karlsson (Gothenburg University) and René Verdonk (Ghent University) in 2008. In 2012, Verdonk became Senior Editor and Jon Karlsson the sole editor-in-chief. While the journal was originally published as three relatively thin issues in 1993, its publication frequency increased gradually to the current 12 issues per year with about 300 pages per issue.

Abstracting and indexing 
The journal is abstracted and indexed in:

According to the Journal Citation Reports, the journal has a 2014 impact factor of 3.053, ranking it 7th out of 72 journals in the category "Orthopaedics", 9th out of 81 journals in the category "Sport Sciences", and 31st out of 198 journals in the category "Surgery".

References

External links 
 
 European Society for Sports Traumatology, Knee-surgery and Arthroscopy

Orthopedics journals
Surgery journals
Monthly journals
Springer Science+Business Media academic journals
Publications established in 1993
English-language journals